Kalegowa Stadium is a multi-use stadium in Pallangga, Gowa Regency, South Sulawesi, Indonesia. It is currently used mostly for football matches and is used as the home stadium for Persigowa Gowa

References

Multi-purpose stadiums in Indonesia
Football venues in Indonesia
Buildings and structures in South Sulawesi